Our Lady's High School is a Roman Catholic secondary school for 11- to 18-year-olds in Motherwell, North Lanarkshire, that is close to Fir Park stadium. The school educates around 675 pupils. The headteacher is Dan Cardle.

History
The school was established in 1888, making it one of the oldest Roman Catholic secondary schools in Scotland. It was originally an all-boys school and the first class of girls was not enrolled until 1945. In the same year, the school's famous War Memorial Chapel, built with funds raised by the school community, was opened. The current building on Dalzell Drive was built in 1974. In 1975, Our Lady's made it into the Guinness Book of Records, having a school roll of 2,325 pupils, making it the largest school in Scotland.

Since 1997, Our Lady's has shared its accommodation with Bothwellpark High School which caters for students who require extra educational support.

Houses
The four school houses are named after famous holy people with ties to Scotland: St. Andrew, Queen Margaret of Scotland, St. Columba and the Venerable Margaret Sinclair. The house colours are red, blue, yellow, and green respectively.

Performing arts and physical education
The school wind band achieved a gold at the National Concert Band Festival in 2005-06. On 30 March 2007 the band attained a gold award at the Festival and then won the Lanarkshire Youth Musical Award for 2007.

Their senior football team achieved national success in 2000 when they won the Under-18 Scottish Schools Football Shield. This was the eighth time the school has won this prestigious trophy.

Notable former pupils

 Sir Matt Busby, former manager of Manchester United
 Sir Tom Devine, historian
 Patrick Doyle, composer
 Colin Fox, former MSP
 Charles "Chic" McSherry OBE, businessman, writer and musician
 Martin Ledwith, actor
 Brian McCardie, actor
 Billy McNeill, footballer for Celtic and Scotland
 Bobby Murdoch, footballer for Celtic and Scotland
 Stephen Pearson, footballer
 Frank Roy, former MP (1997-2015)
 Thomas Cardinal Winning, Archbishop of Glasgow
Kieran Tierney, footballer for Arsenal and Scotland (first year only)

References

External links
 Official site
Our Lady's High School's page on Scottish Schools Online
Our Lady’s High School’s website

Catholic secondary schools in North Lanarkshire
Buildings and structures in Motherwell
Educational institutions established in 1895
1895 establishments in Scotland